The Unfriendly Countries List is a list of countries published by the Russian government that it says "commit unfriendly actions against Russia, Russian companies and citizens". Countries added to the Unfriendly Countries List are subject to certain restrictions related to their relationships with Russia, including trade and currency restrictions and hiring limits in the listed countries' diplomatic missions in Russia.

The list was first published in May 2021 where it consisted of the United States and the Czech Republic. Following the start of the Russian invasion of Ukraine on 24 February 2022 and international sanctions imposed against Russia, the list has since been expanded to 49 states. All G7 member states and all 27 European Union member states are on the list. Turkey is currently the only NATO member to not be on the list.

List of countries and regions 
The Czech Republic and the United States were added to the list in May 2021, while the rest of the countries on the list were added from March 2022 onwards.

Background 
In June 2018, Russian President Vladimir Putin signed a law empowering the government to introduce countermeasures against countries determined to have engaged in "unfriendly" actions against Russia. The countermeasures listed included import and export restrictions, suspension or termination of international cooperation, or privatization of state assets. An announcement on the passage of the legislation published by Russian state media specifically named the United States as the law's target.

In April 2021, Russian foreign ministry spokeswoman Maria Zakharova announced that Russia would be publishing an "Unfriendly Countries List" that includes the United States. Early drafts of the list were leaked and included up to ten countries, but the final list issued by Russia only contained two: the United States and the Czech Republic. In publishing the list, the Russian government restricted the Czech embassy in Russia to hiring no more than 19 Russian nationals, and prohibiting the U.S. embassy in Russia from hiring any local employees.

Russia's relations with both countries were at a low point at the time. The United States and Russia had recently expelled each other's diplomats and the United States imposed sanctions against Russia in retaliation to claimed Russian cyberattacks and interference in American elections. Similarly, the Czech Republic accused Russian intelligence officers of being behind two ammunition warehouse explosions inside the country in 2014.

2022 list expansion 
In February 2022, after Russia launched a full scale invasion of neighboring Ukraine, numerous countries around the world began instituting economic sanctions against Russia in retaliation for the invasion with a goal of crippling the Russian economy, in addition to Micronesia's decision to sever diplomatic relations with Russia. In response, Russia expanded the Unfriendly Countries List to include 48 countries around the world that had imposed the sanctions or severed diplomatic relations.

In March 2022, decree number 299 modified intellectual property laws in Russia. Countries on the Unfriendly Countries List would not receive reciprocity for copyrighted goods.

Restrictions against listed countries and regions 
The legal basis for instituting sanctions against countries deemed "unfriendly" to Russia was initially passed in June 2018 with a menu of available countermeasures, including import and export restrictions, suspension or termination of international cooperation, or privatization of state assets, but no specific targets were listed. When the United States and the Czech Republic were added to the list in April 2021, Russia restricted the numbers of local employees that could be hired by the two countries' diplomatic missions in Russia. The Czech Republic's embassy could only hire 19 Russian employees, while the United States embassy could not hire any.

In March 2022, in retaliation to sanctions imposed against Russia in response to their invasion of Ukraine, Russia added an additional 48 countries that had imposed sanctions against it to the Unfriendly Countries List. Creditors from countries on the list who sought to receive payments on the debt were required to open a special bank account at a Russian bank to receive payments in Russia's currency, rubles, rather than another international currency. In addition, all new corporate deals between Russian companies and entities in countries on the Unfriendly Countries List had to seek approval from a government commission.

Putin announced several weeks later that Russia would only accept the ruble as payment for Russia's natural gas exports to countries on the Unfriendly Countries List. As a result of the freezing of Russian Central Bank foreign reserves in euro and dollars by the unfriendly countries, in addition to the SWIFT ban on dollar and euro transfers to or from a large portion of the Russian banking sector, Russia no longer considered payment in dollars and euro via foreign accounts viable. Russian Gazprombank and Rosneftbank were spared from the SWIFT sanctions to allow payments for Russian gas and oil to be processed to Gazprom and Rosneft. However Russia still faced a risk that dollar or euro energy payments stored in these banks might also be frozen there in a future SWIFT ban extension. With the requirement to pay in rubles this is forestalled. Putin said that as a result, it "made no sense" to receive payments in other currencies. In addition the international sanctions against Russia caused the value of the ruble to plummet. The European Union, which was added to the list, relies on Russia for 40% of its natural gas imports, and forcing payments in rubles could help to inflate the demand for and value of the currency.

Russian President Vladimir Putin signed a decree introducing visa restrictions for citizens from "unfriendly countries," a decision made in retaliation to hostile measures taken by the European Union, the Kremlin said on April 4, 2022. According to the decree, Russia will partially suspend its simplified visa agreements with EU member countries along with Norway, Iceland, Switzerland and Liechtenstein. The Kremlin said that the decree also ordered the country's foreign ministry to impose individual entry restrictions on foreigners and stateless persons who commit hostile acts against Russia, its citizens or legal entities.

Russia banned the export of inert gases including neon and helium to "unfriendly countries" on May 31, 2022. This was a counter sanction which followed a ban on electronics exports to Russia.

On July 22, 2022, Russia added Croatia, Denmark, Greece, Slovakia and Slovenia individually to the list, separate from the European Union. Russian Prime Minister Mikhail Mishustin stated that the list is now made up of countries that "adopted actions that are unfriendly toward Russia and particularly against Russia's diplomatic and consular representations abroad." The Danish embassy in Russia has been limited to 20 staff, the Greek embassy to 34 and the Slovak embassy to 16. Additionally, the Croat and Slovene embassies "will not be able to hire employees in their diplomatic missions and consular offices".

On July 24, 2022, Russia added the Bahamas, as well as the British Crown Dependencies of Guernsey and the Isle of Man to the list.

On September 5, 2022, Russia terminated the agreement with Japan on facilitated visits to the Kuril Islands by Japanese citizens, former residents of these islands.

On October 30, 2022, Russia added 11 British territories to unfriendly countries list. The Russian Cabinet's website said, "Eleven more British Overseas Territories have been added to the list that supported the sanctions imposed by the UK on Russia. These are: Bermuda, British Antarctic Territory, British Indian Ocean Territory, Cayman Islands, Falkland Islands, Montserrat, Pitcairn Islands, St. Helena, Ascension and Tristan da Cunha Islands, South Georgia and the South Sandwich Islands, Akrotiri and Dhekelia, Turks and Caicos Islands." Along with three British-controlled territories - the island of Anguilla, the British Virgin Islands and Gibraltar - this amounted to all 14 British Overseas Territories being included on the list.

See also 
 Unreliable Entities List
 2022 boycott of Russia and Belarus
 2022 Russia–European Union gas dispute
 Reciprocity (international relations)

References 

2021 in Russia
2022 in Russia
Anti-Western sentiment
Boycotts of countries
Energy policy of Russia
Foreign relations of Russia
Foreign trade of Russia
Geopolitics
International sanctions
Russo-Ukrainian War
Sanctions and boycotts during the Russo-Ukrainian War
War and politics